Kalle Koljonen (born 26 February 1994) is a Finnish badminton player. In 2014, he won a bronze medal at the European Men's Team Championships in Basel. He won his first international title at the 2015 Hungarian International. Koljonen became first ever badminton player from his country to medal at the European Championships in 2021.

Achievements

European Championships 
Men's singles

BWF International Challenge/Series (2 titles, 6 runners-up) 
Men's singles

  BWF International Challenge tournament
  BWF International Series tournament
  BWF Future Series tournament

References

External links 
 

1994 births
Living people
Sportspeople from Helsinki
Finnish male badminton players
Badminton players at the 2020 Summer Olympics
Olympic badminton players of Finland
21st-century Finnish people